Bryan Charles Fairfax  (12 September 1873 – 29 January 1950) was an English first-class cricketer and British Army officer.

The son of Thomas Ferdinand Fairfax, he was born in September 1873 at Bilbrough, Yorkshire. Fairfax attended the Royal Military College, Sandhurst and graduated from there as a second lieutenant into the Durham Light Infantry in March 1893. While serving in British India, he made two appearances in first-class cricket for the Europeans cricket team against the Parsees in the Bombay Presidency Matches of 1897. He scored 42 runs in his two matches, with a highest score of 25. He was promoted to lieutenant in August 1896, before being seconded for service with the Weihaiwei Regiment in December 1899. During his secondment he saw action in the Boxer Rebellion. He was promoted to captain in February 1900, before being seconded for service in the Second Boer War. Fairfax was appointed aide-de-camp to Major-General Sir Neville Lyttelton in 1903 and later served as aide-de-camp to Sir Arthur Lawley, the Governor of Madras. 

Fairfax later served in the First World War, being placed in command of the 17th Battalion, King's Regiment (Liverpool) in February 1915, upon which he was granted the temporary rank of lieutenant colonel. He was placed in command of the Chinese workers of the Chinese Labour Corps in November 1916, with the Corps officially being formed in February 1917. He was admitted to the Order of St Michael and St George in the 1918 New Year Honours, with promotion to major following in the same month, antedated to September 1914. In March 1918, he was appointed a temporary colonel in February 1918, while employed as an assistant adjutant general. He relinquished the rank in February 1919, before gaining the full rank in May 1919. Following the war, he was decorated by the Republic of China with the Order of Wen-Hu, 3rd Class in February 1920. Following his retirement, he became a well known racehorse owner in the North-East of England, purchasing the Blink Bonny Stud Farm in 1927. Fairfax died in January 1950 at Whitwell Hall in Whitwell-on-the-Hill, Yorkshire.

References

External links

1873 births
1950 deaths
People from Selby District
Graduates of the Royal Military College, Sandhurst
Durham Light Infantry officers
English cricketers
Europeans cricketers
British Army personnel of the Boxer Rebellion
British Army personnel of the Second Boer War
British Army personnel of World War I
King's Regiment (Liverpool) officers
Chinese Labour Corps officers
Companions of the Order of St Michael and St George
English racehorse owners and breeders